Dock Océane is an indoor sporting arena located in Le Havre, France.  The capacity of the arena is 3,598 people.  It is currently home to the Saint Thomas Basket Le Havre basketball team.
It is located near Havre AC's Stade Océane. 

Indoor arenas in France
Basketball venues in France
Sports venues in Seine-Maritime
Buildings and structures in Le Havre